The Eurovision Song Contest Previews are annually broadcast TV shows showcasing the entries into the forthcoming Eurovision Song Contest. They were inaugurated in 1971 for the contest in Dublin, Ireland, and have been provided by the European Broadcasting Union (EBU) to all participating countries ever since.

For a period, the BBC were responsible for 'collecting' the preview videos and distributing them to the various participating countries. This has been carried out by the contest's host nation more recently. Between 2004 and 2007, the Nordic broadcasters (Iceland, Sweden, Denmark, Norway and Finland) co-produced preview shows for broadcast across their region.

Background
All participants in the Eurovision Song Contest are required to submit a video of their entry to the EBU via the host broadcaster, to be distributed across the Eurovision network. From 1971 until the early 1990s, it was compulsory for all participants to broadcast the videos. Since the mid-1990s it has become optional. Broadcasters either submit a performance of the given song – usually taken from their local national final – or a music video of the entry, specifically filmed for the purpose. In 1971, the Belgian preview video featured singers Nicole & Hugo who were forced to withdraw days before the Eurovision final due to illness, being replaced by Jacques Raymond and Lily Castel.

Occasionally countries rely on funding from their government tourism budget to produce the video, leading to highly commercial offerings highlighting the given country's natural beauty. Often songs would vary from the version that would be heard in the contest itself; either through a change in language or a variance between the length of the recorded version and the permitted live version, or through a variance in orchestration and arrangement.

Rules
Early rules stated that the videos could not be broadcast in any less than two shows, with no more than half the songs in any show and the songs had to be broadcast in full. Later amendments allowed the videos to be broadcast incomplete, but that meant the videos still had to have a uniform length of duration. Generally speaking, the countries broadcast the shows in two parts, the entries divided as evenly as practicable between the two shows. It was also stated in the rule book that the name of the broadcasting TV station for each country be carried on screen to introduce the songs, but many broadcasters ignored this. Some broadcasters would credit the contributing TV station verbally rather than on screen.

History

1974
In 1974, a two-night preview programme, Auftakt für Brighton (Prelude for Brighton), was coordinated by the German national broadcaster ARD. It was broadcast at the end of March and hosted by the journalist Karin Tietze-Ludwig. It was the first "preview"-type programme to be broadcast in many European countries simultaneously (rather than each national broadcaster showing their own preview programme). The programme was also notable in being the European television debut for the winners, ABBA, who were peculiarly credited in previews as "The Abba". It was first aired on German television Hessischer Rundfunk on 27–28 March and in Finland on 30 March as Eurovision laulukilpailu. The UK did not broadcast the programmes, instead airing their own preview shows introduced by David Vine on BBC1 on 24 and 31 March, unusually dividing the entries into six songs for the first show and twelve for the second, contrary to the stated rules. In the same year, the French entry was broadcast by all the nations showing the previews, even though the song was withdrawn from the Eurovision final itself.

1977
In 1977, the previews were broadcast across Europe ahead of the original scheduled broadcast date of 2 April for the Eurovision final. When the contest was postponed to 7 May, this left a long gap between the preview shows airing and the final.

1982
For the Eurovision Song Contest 1982 Grand Final, several clips from the preview videos were incorporated into the short 'postcards' used to introduce each nation's entry as part of a video montage. It was the first time the previews were represented in the contest. Only clips from the previews that were not of the performer in a national final or performing the song in studio were used, limiting the usage to half of the 18 contenders. Those that were included: Portugal, Turkey, Switzerland, Ireland, United Kingdom, Cyprus, Finland, Yugoslavia and Spain. Since 1982, only in 2000 were any clips from the previews utilized again, as clips from the Turkish preview were used as a partial background video for the live performance of the Turkish entry.

1990
For the Eurovision Song Contest 1990 Grand Final, at the end of postcard introducing each song, the animated EuroCat (that year's contest mascot) appeared on screen to click a cartoon camera, the resulting photograph being a still of the artist captured from the previews clips, but represented in monochrome rather than colour.

Modern day
From approximately 2000, the videos have been available online via the Eurovision website and most broadcasters upload them to their own, local Eurovision site.

San Marino broadcaster SMtv televised the previews for the first time in 2012, showing the videos in multiple programmes in the run up to the contest on a rotating basis, hosted by John Kennedy O'Connor. SMtv continued with the previews each year since, under various formats, until O'Connor retired in 2019. In 2014 O'Connor presented each entry on location in San Marino and in 2015 each entry was linked by video to the participating country. The 2016, 2017 & 2018 previews were presented in a studio setting. SM Rtv revived the previews in 2022, hosted by commentator Lia Fiorio, under the title "Countdown to Eurovision".

UK broadcasts

In the United Kingdom, the BBC broadcast the programmes in two parts, every year from 1971 to 1994 on BBC1 and then again between 2002 and 2004 on BBC Choice, later BBC Three, in multiple shows over one week. The preview shows have been hosted by a variety of presenters over the years; including Terry Wogan, Gloria Hunniford, Ken Bruce and Lorraine Kelly.

Format
Generally, but by no means always, the songs were broadcast in the order they would appear in the contest, with the UK entry saved until the end. For 1979 to 1982, the songs were shown in a random order, despite host Terry Wogan insisting in 1979 that the songs were being shown in competition order during the broadcasts. In 1982, the UK entry was scheduled to be broadcast at the end of the second programme, but was also included in the first programme in the absence of the Greek entry that was withdrawn while the shows were in production. In 1983, the UK preview video consisted of the group Sweet Dreams in speed boats off the coast of Dover, Southern England, with the engine noise of the vessels included in the soundtrack, partially obscuring the song itself.

From 1971 to 1994, the shows were broadcast on Sunday afternoons with just two exceptions. In 1972, the shows were given a prime-time airing as part of the BBC1 Monday evening schedule at 7:30PM and in 1973, the shows were instead broadcast on Saturday afternoons. The revived shows from 2002 to 2004 were shown in the evening schedule firstly on BBC Choice (2002) and subsequently on BBC Three  and broadcast from a London studio. In 2004, the previews were featured as part of two Eurovision on Location shows broadcast from the host city that year, Istanbul.

From 1976 to 1985, the BBC provided a specifically filmed 'video' of the artist on location in the UK. In all other years, they have simply provided the performance from the national final, although often the artist's record company will also send their own commercially released video for use by the broadcasters, but these were never shown in the UK broadcasts. From 1984, the BBC included the contributing broadcasters acronym on screen for each entry.

The 1994 preview show, which would be the last for eight years, was renamed Tips For Le Top and included analysis by "swingometer" expert Peter Snow who gave out the odds on victory for each act with only two minutes of each song broadcast. It also featured a special Eurovision-themed edition of quiz show Mastermind with four fan contestants. The competition was won by David Bridgman representing United Kingdom with Wogan acting as quizmaster. The other contestants were Johnny O'Mahony (Ireland), Marc Dierckx (Belgium) and Henry Klok (Netherlands). Prizes were presented by four-time Eurovision hostess, Katie Boyle.

By year
The UK broadcast details are as follows, with the countries listed in the order they were shown:

1970s

1980s

1990s

2000s
The preview shows returned in 2002 as Liquid Eurovision, a spin-off from Liquid News and were renamed Eurovision on Location in 2004 following the cancellation of Liquid News a month before the contest that year. Only brief snippets of the songs were broadcast, the emphasis of the programmes being on the reactions from the guests.

Notes

References

1971 British television series debuts
2004 British television series endings
1970s British music television series
1980s British music television series
1990s British music television series
2000s British music television series
BBC Television shows
Music television specials
Previews
English-language television shows
Television shows set in Europe